Nataliia Kobzar (19 January 2000) is a Ukrainian Paralympic athlete. She competes in 100, 200 and 400 metres sprinting events for T37-classified athletes. She won the silver medal in the women's 400 metres T37 event at the 2020 Summer Paralympics held in Tokyo, Japan.

She is a two-time gold medalist at the World Para Athletics Championships and also at the World Para Athletics European Championships. She also won five silver medals at these competitions.

Career 

At the World Para Athletics Championships, she won the gold medals in the women's 200 metres T37 event at the 2017 World Para Athletics Championships held in London, United Kingdom and in the women's 400 metres T37 event at the 2019 World Para Athletics Championships held in Dubai, United Arab Emirates.

In 2021, she won three medals at the World Para Athletics European Championships held in Bydgoszcz, Poland: she won the gold medal in her 400 metres event and the silver medals in her 100 metres and 200 metres events.

Achievements

References

External links 
 

Living people
2000 births
Place of birth missing (living people)
World Para Athletics Championships winners
Medalists at the World Para Athletics European Championships
Medalists at the World Para Athletics Championships
Athletes (track and field) at the 2020 Summer Paralympics
Medalists at the 2020 Summer Paralympics
Paralympic athletes of Ukraine
Paralympic silver medalists for Ukraine
Paralympic medalists in athletics (track and field)
Ukrainian female sprinters
21st-century Ukrainian women